Luigi Albertini (19 October 1871–29 December 1941) was an influential Italian newspaper editor, member of the Parliament, and historian of the First World War.

As editor of one of Italy's best-known newspapers,  Corriere della Sera of Milan, he was a champion of liberalism.  He was a vigorous opponent of socialism and clericalism, and of Prime Minister Giovanni Giolitti who was willing to compromise with those forces.  Albertini's opposition to the Fascist regime forced the owners to fire him in 1925.

Albertini was an outspoken antifascist even though at one time, he supported the National Fascist Party for opposing the Left. From 1914 to Benito Mussolini's March on Rome in 1922, he was a member of parliament in the Italian Senate, where he was a key intellectual and moderating force.

Life

Albertini was born in Ancona on 19 October 1871. After reading law at the University of Turin, in 1894 he moved to London, where he was foreign correspondent for La Stampa of Turin. While in London he investigated labour conditions and studied the organization of The Times newspaper. In 1898 he joined the Milan newspaper, Corriere della Sera as an editorial assistant, working under Eugenio Torelli Viollier and then Domenico Oliva. In the spring of 1900, Viollier died and Albertini took his position as managing editor, and a few weeks later director. He also invested in the paper. He installed modern equipment and updated the paper's technical services.  Under Albertini's direction, Corriere della Sera became the most widely read and respected daily paper in Italy. However, in November 1925, the paper's owners, the Crespi family, sacked him because of his public stance against the fascist government. His last editorial was included in the 29 November 1925 edition.

After that, Albertini withdrew from public life and retired to his model estate at Torre in Pietra, near Rome. There, he dedicated his time to managing the estate and reclaiming land on it. He also extensively researched Italy's role in the First and Second World Wars. He wrote his memoirs and had just completed his three-volume seminal work on the origins of the First World War when he died on 29 December 1941 in Rome.

Legacy
Albertini's three-volume The Origins of the War of 1914 was his highest achievement and brought him world fame. He researched and wrote it with the assistance of Luciano Magrini, a former Corriere della Sera foreign correspondent who was skilled in German. From 1928 to 1940, Magrini interviewed many of the protagonists of the First World War. He obtained numerous documents that are reproduced in the work, which was published in Italian in 1942 and 1943. It was translated into English by Isabella Massey and published by Oxford University Press in 1953.

Alberto Albertini wrote the first biography of his brother, which was published in Italian in 1945. Since 1965 Ottavio Brié, formerly of the political science facility at the University of Rome, has had access to Luigi Albertini's huge correspondence, which he has edited and published. He also researched and wrote a second biography, Luigi Albertini, which was published in Italian in 1972.

Notes

References

 
 Albertini, Luigi (1942–1943) Le origini della guerra del 1914 (3 volumes). Fratelli Bocca, Milano
 Albertini, Luigi (1953) Origins of the War of 1914 (3 volumes). Oxford University Press. London. Translated from Italian by Isabella Massey. Vol. I Vol. II Vol. III
 Albertini, Luigi (2005) [Orig pub.1952–1957] Origins of the War of 1914 (3 volumes). Enigma Books. London.   New Introduction by Dr. Samuel R. Williamson. Amazon
 
 Luigi Albertini's last editorial in the Corriere della Sera (translated into English)
 Brié, Ottavio (1972) Luigi Albertini.Unione tipografica editrice torinese, Torino.  (Luigi Albertini biography)

Further reading
 Review Article from European History Quarterly Vol. 6 #1 (1 January 1976) pp. 139–146 Sage Journals On Line, preview of page 1
 Article from International Communication Gazette #13 (1967) pp. 338–361  Sage Journals On Line, preview of page 1
 Schmitt, Bernadotte E. "The Origins of the War of 1914," Journal of Modern History (1952) 24#1 pp. 69–74 in JSTOR, detailed review

External links

 
 Luigi Albertini from Encyclopædia Britannica Online

19th-century Italian journalists
20th-century Italian journalists
1871 births
1941 deaths
People from Ancona
Members of the Senate of the Kingdom of Italy
Politicians of Marche
Italian newspaper editors
Italian male journalists
Manifesto of the Anti-Fascist Intellectuals
University of Turin alumni
Italian magazine founders